Frederick Johnson (14 March 1851 – 24 November 1923) was an English cricketer. He played twenty first-class matches for Surrey between 1878 and 1883.

See also
 List of Surrey County Cricket Club players

References

External links
 

1851 births
1923 deaths
Cricketers from Kent
English cricketers
People from Rolvenden
Surrey cricketers